Martin Drotár (born 5 November 1981 in Košice, Czechoslovakia) is a Slovak former professional ice hockey player.

Drotár played in the Slovak Extraliga for HC Košice, HK Dubnica, MHK Kežmarok, HC '05 Banská Bystrica, HK SKP Poprad and MHC Martin. He also had a spell in France's Ligue Magnus for Ducs de Dijon.

Career statistics

External links

1981 births
Living people
Ducs de Dijon players
HK Dukla Michalovce players
HC '05 Banská Bystrica players
HC Košice players
HK Poprad players
MHC Martin players
MHK Kežmarok players
Slovak ice hockey forwards
Sportspeople from Košice
Slovak expatriate sportspeople in France
Expatriate ice hockey players in France
Slovak expatriate ice hockey people